Herbert Dunn may refer to:

 Herbert O. Dunn (1857–1939), admiral in the United States Navy
 Herbert Dunn (politician) (1883–1952), Australian politician 
 Herbert Henry Dunn, English architect and surveyor